Sayrite (Pb2(UO2)5O6(OH)24(H2O)) is an alteration product of uraninite named after the X-ray crystallographer David Sayre.  Sayrite contains hydrogen, oxygen, uranium, and lead. It is mined at Shinkolobwe Mine, (Kasolo Mine), Kambove District, Haut-Katanga, Democratic Republic of the Congo. It is usually orange in color, but also can be reddish and yellowish. It is in the monoclinic crystal system.

References

Uranium(VI) minerals
Lead minerals